Biltine may refer to:
 Biltine, Chad
 Biltine Prefecture
 Biltine Department
 Biltine Region, now named Wadi Fira
 Biltine language, other name: Amdang language